K252a is an alkaloid isolated from Nocardiopsis bacteria.  This staurosporine analog is a highly potent cell permeable inhibitor of CaM kinase and phosphorylase kinase (IC50 = 1.8 and 1.7 nmol/L, respectively). At higher concentrations it is also an efficient inhibitor of serine/threonine protein kinases (IC50 of 10 to 30 nmol/L).

K252a is reported to promote myogenic differentiation in C2 mouse myoblasts and has been shown to block the neuronal differentiation of rat pheochromocytoma PC12 cells by inhibition of trk tyrosine kinase activity.

K252a has been reported in preclinical research as a potential treatment for psoriasis<ref>Promising New Treatments for Psoriasis,</p> Sarah Dubois Declercq  and Roxane Pouliot >.The Scientific World Journal; Volume 2013, Article ID 980419; https://dx.doi.org/10.1155/2013/980419</ref>

K252a inhibits tyrosine phosphorylation of Trk A induced by NGF. PC12 cells were incubated in the presence or absence of 10 ng/ml NGF with or without various concentrations of K252a.

See also
 Lestaurtinib
 ANA-12
 Cyclotraxin B

References

Further reading

Indole alkaloids
Indolocarbazoles
Lactams
Protein kinase inhibitors
TrkB antagonists
Tertiary alcohols
Methyl esters